Napoléon La Cécilia (13 September 1835 - 25 November 1878) was a French general.

Biography

References

External links

1835 births
1878 deaths
French generals
French people of the Franco-Prussian War
Military personnel from Tours, France
People of the Italian unification
People of the Paris Commune